This is a list of player transfers involving Aviva Premiership teams before or during the 2016–17 season. The list is of deals that are confirmed and are either from or to a rugby union team in the Premier League during the 2015–16 season.  It is not unknown for confirmed deals to be cancelled at a later date.

Bath

Players In
 Luke Charteris from  Racing 92
 Taulupe Faletau from  Newport Gwent Dragons
 Elliott Stooke from  Gloucester Rugby
 Michael van Vuuren from  Leicester Tigers
 Harry Davies from  Cardiff Blues
 Kahn Fotuali'i from  Northampton Saints
 Jack Walker from  Yorkshire Carnegie
 Aled Brew from  Newport Gwent Dragons
 Will Homer promoted from Academy
 Max Clark promoted from Academy
 Robbie Fruean from  Crusaders
 Paul Grant from  Nottingham
 Jack Wilson from  Highlanders
 Ben Tapuai from  Western Force

Players Out
 Will Spencer to  Worcester Warriors
 Ollie Devoto to  Exeter Chiefs
 Rob Webber to  Sale Sharks
 Jonathan Evans to  Scarlets
 Luke Arscott to  Bristol Rugby
 Max Northcote-Green to  London Irish
 Brett Herron to  Ulster
 Stuart Hooper retired
 Dominic Day to  Toyota Verblitz/ Melbourne Rebels
 Amanaki Mafi to  NTT Communications Shining Arcs/ Melbourne Rebels
 Tom Woolstencroft to  Wasps
 Leroy Houston to  Queensland Reds
 Horacio Agulla to  Castres Olympique
 Kyle Eastmond to  Wasps
 Alafoti Fa'osiliva to  Worcester Warriors
 David Wilson to  Newcastle Falcons

Bristol

Players In
 Martin Roberts from  Ospreys
 Rhodri Williams from  Scarlets
 Luke Arscott from  Bath Rugby
 Tusi Pisi from  Sunwolves
 Jordan Williams from  Scarlets
 Nick Fenton-Wells from  Bedford Blues
 Jordan Crane from  Leicester Tigers
 Thretton Palamo from  Saracens
 Jon Fisher from  Northampton Saints
 Soane Tonga'uiha from  Oyonnax
 Will Hurrell from  Doncaster Knights
 Giorgi Nemsadze from  Tarbes
 Ryan Bevington from  Ospreys
 Jason Woodward from  Hurricanes
 Shane Geraghty from  London Irish
 Dan Tuohy from  Ulster

Players Out
 Matthew Morgan to  Cardiff Blues
 Marco Mama to  Worcester Warriors
 Dwayne Peel retired
 Craig Hampson to  Wasps
 George Watkins to  Jersey Reds
 Ellis Genge to  Leicester Tigers
 Tommaso Benvenuti to  Benetton Treviso
 Josh Ovens to  Rosslyn Park
 Darren Hudson released
 James Stephenson to  Hartpury RFC

Exeter Chiefs

Players In
 Greg Holmes from  Queensland Reds
 Ollie Devoto from  Bath Rugby
 Dave Dennis from  NSW Waratahs
 Lachlan Turner from  Toulon

Players Out
 Adam Hughes to  Newport Gwent Dragons
 Josh Jones to  Salford Red Devils
 Alex Brown to  USA Perpignan
 Brett Sturgess to  Ampthill
 Jerry Sexton to  London Irish
 Byron McGuigan to  Sale Sharks
 Lewis Stevenson to  Connacht
 Chrysander Botha to  Welwitschias

Gloucester

Players In
 Lewis Ludlow promoted from Academy
 Matt Scott from  Edinburgh Rugby
 Motu Matu'u from  Hurricanes
 Josh Hohneck from  Highlanders
 Tom Denton from  Leinster
 Andy Symons from  Worcester Warriors
 Dan Thomas promoted from Academy
 Ollie Thorley promoted from Academy
 Cameron Orr from  Greater Sydney Rams
 Salesi Ma'afu from  Cardiff Blues

Players Out
 Elliott Stooke to  Bath Rugby
 Steve McColl to  Yorkshire Carnegie
 Luke Cole to  Rotherham Titans
 Tom Hicks to  Rotherham Titans
 James Gibbons to  Ealing Trailfinders
 Rob Cook retired
 Bill Meakes to  Western Force
 Steph Reynolds retired
 Dan Murphy to  Harlequins
 Nick Wood retired
 Nicky Thomas to  Scarlets
 James Hudson retired

Harlequins

Players In
 Charlie Mulchrone from  Worcester Warriors
 Ruaridh Jackson from  Wasps
 Aaron Morris from  Saracens
 Mark Reddish from  Highlanders
 George Naoupu from  Connacht
 Cameron Holenstein from  Pau
 Alofa Alofa from  La Rochelle
 Dan Murphy from  Gloucester Rugby

Players Out
 Kieran Treadwell to  Ulster
 Tito Tebaldi to  Benetton Treviso
 Ben Botica to  Montpellier
 Nick Easter retired
 Beau Robinson to  Doncaster Knights
 Ollie Lindsay-Hague to  England Sevens

Leicester Tigers

Players In
 Matt To'omua from  Brumbies
 JP Pietersen from  Sharks
 Tom Brady from  Sale Sharks
 George McGuigan from  Newcastle Falcons
 Pat Cilliers from  Montpellier
 Luke Hamilton from  Agen
 Ellis Genge from  Bristol Rugby

Players Out
 Leonardo Ghiraldini to  Toulouse
 Tommy Bell to  London Irish
 Laurence Pearce to  Sale Sharks
 Vereniki Goneva to  Newcastle Falcons
 Miles Benjamin retired
 Seremaia Bai retired
 Sebastian De Chaves to  London Irish
 Michael van Vuuren to  Bath Rugby
 Jean de Villiers retired/released
 George Tresidder to  Rotherham Titans
 Jordan Crane to  Bristol Rugby
 Tiziano Pasquali to  Benetton Treviso
 Matías Agüero to  Provence
 Christian Loamanu to  Provence
 Opeti Fonua to  Newcastle Falcons

Newcastle Falcons

Players In
 Joshua Chisanga from  Kenya Sevens
 Vereniki Goneva from  Leicester Tigers
 Sam Lockwood from  Jersey Reds
 Sam Egerton from  England Sevens
 Harrison Orr from  Ealing Trailfinders
 Joel Hodgson from  Yorkshire Carnegie
 Ben Sowrey from  Worcester Warriors
 Evan Olmstead from  London Scottish
 Nick Civetta from  RC I Medicei
 Andrew Davidson from  Glasgow Hawks
 Kyle Cooper from  Sharks
 Tyrone Holmes from  Glasgow Warriors
 Opeti Fonua from  Leicester Tigers
 Dominic Waldouck from  Ohio Aviators
 Fred Burdon from  Yorkshire Carnegie
 David Wilson from  Bath Rugby

Players Out
 George McGuigan to  Leicester Tigers
 Todd Clever released
 Andy Goode retired
 Rob Hawkins retired
 Richard Mayhew to  Yorkshire Carnegie
 Joshua Furno to  Zebre
 Kensuke Hatakeyama to  Suntory Sungoliath
 Kane Thompson to  Manawatu
 Giovanbattista Venditti to  Zebre
 Michael Cusack to  Yorkshire Carnegie
 Eric Fry to  Sacramento Express
 Ruki Tipuna to  Bay of Plenty
 Jamie Booth to  Manawatu
 Scott MacLeod retired
 Gonzalo Tiesi retired
 Taione Vea retired
 Alesana Tuilagi released
 Anitelea Tuilagi released

Northampton Saints

Players In
 Louis Picamoles from  Toulouse
 Campese Ma'afu from  Provence
 Charlie Clare from  Bedford Blues
 Nic Groom from  Stormers
 Juan Pablo Estelles from  Club Atlético del Rosario
 Api Ratuniyarawa from  Agen
 Nafi Tuitavake from  RC Narbonne

Players Out
 Alex Corbisiero sabbatical (released)
 Matt Williams to  Worcester Warriors
 Danny Hobbs-Awoyemi to  London Irish
 Patrick Howard to  Newport Gwent Dragons
 Kahn Fotuali'i to  Bath Rugby
 Jon Fisher to  Bristol Rugby

Sale Sharks

Players In
 Rob Webber from  Bath Rugby
 Laurence Pearce from  Leicester Tigers
 Kieran Longbottom from  Saracens
 Josh Charnley from  Wigan Warriors
 AJ MacGinty from  Connacht
 Dan Mugford from  Nottingham
 Mike Phillips from  Racing 92
 Halani Aulika from  London Irish
 Lou Reed from  Cardiff Blues
 Byron McGuigan from  Exeter Chiefs
 Curtis Langdon from  London Irish

Players Out
 Vadim Cobilas to  Bordeaux Begles
 Tommy Taylor to  Wasps
 Danny Cipriani to  Wasps
 Tom Brady to  Leicester Tigers
 Phil Mackenzie to  San Diego Breakers
 Nick Macleod to  Newport Gwent Dragons
 Joe Ford to  Yorkshire Carnegie
 Chris Cusiter retired
 Mark Easter retired
 Viliami Fihaki to  Edinburgh Rugby

Saracens

Players In
 Schalk Burger from 
 Alex Lozowski from  Wasps
 Mark Flanagan from  Bedford Blues
 Sean Maitland from  London Irish
 Vincent Koch from  Stormers

Players Out
 Charlie Hodgson retired
 Rhys Gill to  Cardiff Blues
 Catalin Fercu to  Timișoara Saracens
 Kieran Longbottom to  Sale Sharks
 Dave Porecki to  London Irish
 Jacques Burger retired
 Aaron Morris to  Harlequins
 Hayden Smith to  Esher
 Thretton Palamo to  Bristol Rugby
 Biyi Alo to  Worcester Warriors
 Ben Ransom to  London Irish
 Alistair Hargreaves retired

Wasps

Players In
 Marty Moore from  Leinster
 Tommy Taylor from  Sale Sharks
 Danny Cipriani from  Sale Sharks
 Tom Cruse from  London Irish
 Guy Armitage from  London Welsh
 Craig Hampson from  Bristol Rugby
 Tom Woolstencroft from  Bath Rugby
 Marcus Garratt from  Cornish Pirates
 Kurtley Beale from  NSW Waratahs
 Matt Symons from  London Irish
 Nick de Luca from  Biarritz Olympique
 Kyle Eastmond from  Bath Rugby
 Willie le Roux from  Sharks

Players Out
 Charles Piutau to  Ulster
 Alex Lozowski to  Saracens
 George Smith to  Suntory Sungoliath/ Queensland Reds
 Jamie Stevenson to  London Scottish
 Ed Shervington retired
 Ruaridh Jackson to  Harlequins
 Bradley Davies to  Ospreys
 James Downey retired
 Ben Jacobs retired
 Carlo Festuccia to  Zebre
 Andrea Masi retired
 Lorenzo Cittadini to  Bayonne
 Sailosi Tagicakibau released
 James Cannon to  Connacht

Worcester Warriors

Players In
 Ben Te'o from  Leinster
 Jackson Willison from  Grenoble
 Will Spencer from  Bath Rugby
 Marco Mama from  Bristol Rugby
 Perry Humphreys promoted from Academy
 Dewald Potgieter from  Yamaha Júbilo
 Matt Williams from  Northampton Saints
 Francois Hougaard from  South Africa Sevens
 Biyi Alo from  Saracens
 Alafoti Fa'osiliva from  Bath Rugby

Players Out
 Darren O'Shea to  Munster
 Charlie Mulchrone to  Harlequins
 Jean-Baptiste Bruzulier to  Nevers
 Ben Sowrey to  Newcastle Falcons
 Heath Stevens to  London Welsh
 Joe Rees to  Rotherham Titans
 Andy Symons to  Gloucester Rugby
 Alex Grove to  Birmingham Moseley
 Sam Smith retired
 Matt Gilbert to  Hartpury College RFC
 Dan Sanderson to  Yorkshire Carnegie
 Dan George to  Blackheath 
 Ravai Fatiaki released

See also
List of 2017–18 Pro12 transfers
List of 2016–17 RFU Championship transfers
List of 2016–17 Super Rugby transfers
List of 2016–17 Top 14 transfers

References

2016-17
2016–17 English Premiership (rugby union)